Angom is one of the seven clans of the Meitei people. Angom consists of several Yumnaks which are native peoples of ancient Kangleipak, now Manipur state of India.

See also
Mangang
Luwang
Khuman
Moilang
Kha Nganpa
Salai Leishangthem

References

Clans of Meitei